The Center for the Greek Language is a cultural and educational organization which aims to promote the Greek language and culture. It was founded in 1994. The center is based in Thessaloniki, and also has an office in Athens. The Center for the Greek Language acts as a coordinating, advisory and strategic organ of the Greek Ministry of Education on matters of language education and policy. Its functions include providing materials and support for people learning Greek as a foreign language. It is linked to the Aristotle University of Thessaloniki.

Identity
The goals of the organization entail:
 the fostering and promotion of the Greek language within and outside Greece
 through this, the reinforcement of the national identity of the Greeks in the diaspora
 the organisation of the teaching of Greek to foreigners in Greece and abroad
 the support of the teachers of the Greek language in Greece and abroad
 the production of teaching materials, and anything else which contributes to the promotion and dissemination of the Greek language generally

References

External links
 
 Portal for the Greek language and language education

Greek culture
Language regulators
Greek-language education
Cultural promotion organizations
Educational institutions established in 1994
Organizations based in Thessaloniki
1994 establishments in Greece